Leśniki may refer to the following places:
Leśniki, Białystok County in Podlaskie Voivodeship (north-east Poland)
Leśniki, Siemiatycze County in Podlaskie Voivodeship (north-east Poland)
Leśniki, Sokółka County in Podlaskie Voivodeship (north-east Poland)
Leśniki, Otwock County in Masovian Voivodeship (east-central Poland)
Leśniki, Węgrów County in Masovian Voivodeship (east-central Poland)
Leśniki, Lubusz Voivodeship (west Poland)
Leśniki, Warmian-Masurian Voivodeship (north Poland)
Leśniki, West Pomeranian Voivodeship (north-west Poland)